The Dara Dam was a Roman arch dam at Dara in Mesopotamia (modern-day Turkey), a rare pre-modern example of this dam type. The modern identification of its site is uncertain, but may rather point to a common gravity dam.

Ancient account 
The construction and design of the dam was related by the East Roman historian Procopius around 560 AD in his treatise on the architectural achievements of the Justinian I era (De Aedificiis II.3). His report is notable for its clear understanding of arch action and the distribution of water pressure in arch dams; it provides the earliest description of such types of dam as opposed to the gravity dam, the standard design throughout antiquity and beyond.

Procopius makes two essential points clear: first, the dam had a curved plan in order to withstand the water pressure, and did not follow a more or less curved line just because this was where the most solid bedrock was found, and secondly, the thrust of the water was not contained by the sheer weight of the structure (as in gravity dams), but transferred by the abutments to the wing walls of the gorge through the curvature of the lying arch. Procopius writes:

At a place about forty feet removed from the outer fortifications of the city, between the two cliffs between which the river runs, he constructed a barrier of proper thickness and height. The ends of this he so mortised into each of the two cliffs, that the water of the river could not possibly get by that point, even if it should come down very violently...This barrier was not built in a straight line, but was bent into the shape of a crescent, so that the curve, by lying against the current of the river, might be able to offer still more resistance to the force of the stream.

Another ancient dam working by arch action was the Glanum Dam in France.

Modern exploration 
Field work on the ground by the German scholar Günther Garbrecht in the late 1980s has raised some doubts whether Procopius's account are to be interpreted as referring to an arch dam. Garbrecht was able to identify a dam site near the ancient city-walls whose characteristics were consistent with Procopius' precise description – with the exception of the crescent-shaped contour of the dam.

The discovered structure, a ca. 4 m wide and 5 m high masonry wall with a Roman concrete core, had an estimated crest length of 180–190 m; its middle section was completely destroyed on a length of 60–70 m. Although it cannot be ruled out that the dam once followed a slightly curved course in the gap, the extant flanking walls rather indicate a polygonal ground plan. In this case, the Dara Dam would have resisted the water pressure by its sheer weight, not any arch action. Garbrecht surmises that the irregular shape of the dam may have led Procopius to a poetical allusion to the crescent-shaped firmament. By his own admission, however, his observations in situ fell short of a systematic hydrological and topographical field survey which he urged in view of the continuing deterioration of the ancient site.

See also 
List of Roman dams and reservoirs
Roman architecture
Roman engineering

References

Sources 

Buildings and structures completed in the 6th century
560
Dams in Mardin Province
Ancient Roman dams
Arch dams
6th century in the Byzantine Empire
Buildings of Justinian I